Diagonal Community School District is a rural public K-12 school district headquartered in Diagonal, Iowa. The district, in Ringgold County, serves the town of Diagonal.

All grade levels and the administration share the same building. , it had the lowest enrollment of any Iowa school district: 97; the 12th grade class that year had nine students. Due to the difficult financial situation, the district uses cost-cutting measures such as using dry-erase desktops instead of paper and using the same paint color for all rooms.  Diagonal CSD does not have enough funds to provide elective courses at the senior high school level, so its high school students take those courses at Mount Ayr High School in Mount Ayr.

When the Clearfield Community School District closed on July 1, 2014, the Diagonal district absorbed a portion of it.

The school's mascot is the Maroons. Their colors are maroon and gold.

Diagonal Junior-Senior High School

Athletics
The Maroons compete in the Bluegrass Conference, including the following sports:

Volleyball 
Basketball 
Track and field 
Baseball 
Softball

See also
List of school districts in Iowa

References

External links
 

School districts in Iowa
Education in Ringgold County, Iowa